The canton of Pays de Montaigne et Gurson is an administrative division of the Dordogne department, southwestern France. It was created at the French canton reorganisation which came into effect in March 2015. Its seat is in Port-Sainte-Foy-et-Ponchapt.

It consists of the following communes:

Bonneville-et-Saint-Avit-de-Fumadières
Carsac-de-Gurson
Fougueyrolles
Lamothe-Montravel
Minzac
Montazeau
Montcaret
Montpeyroux
Nastringues
Port-Sainte-Foy-et-Ponchapt
Saint-Antoine-de-Breuilh
Saint-Géraud-de-Corps
Saint-Martin-de-Gurson
Saint-Méard-de-Gurçon
Saint-Michel-de-Montaigne
Saint-Rémy
Saint-Seurin-de-Prats
Saint-Vivien
Vélines
Villefranche-de-Lonchat

References

Cantons of Dordogne